Mastax vegeta is a species of beetle in the family Carabidae found in such Indian provinces as Darjeeling, Himachal Pradesh, Sikkim and Uttarakhand. In Uttarrakhand it was found north-northeast of Ramnagar in the valley near Kosi River. The species have brown pronotum and yellow dots on its black body.

References

Beetles described in 1924
Beetles of Asia
Endemic fauna of India